Viscum cruciatum, commonly called the red-berry mistletoe, is a species of mistletoe in the family Santalaceae. It is native to Lebanon, Morocco, Palestine, Portugal, Spain, and Syria.

The plant has small leaves. The flowers have four petals. The berries are red containing 1 seed. All parts of the plants are poisonous if eaten. Its fruit is harmless to birds which disperse the seeds. It is used as a Christmas decoration.

Gallery

References

External links
 Viscum cruciatum info

cruciatum
Parasitic plants
Flora of Lebanon
Flora of Morocco
Flora of Palestine (region)
Flora of Portugal
Flora of Spain
Flora of Syria
Taxa named by Pierre Edmond Boissier
Taxa named by Franz Sieber
Poisonous plants